Edward Wakefield may refer to:

Politics
 Edward Gibbon Wakefield (1796–1862), British colonizer, son of Edward Wakefield (1774–1854)
 Edward Wakefield (died 1602), MP for Kingston upon Hull
 Jerningham Wakefield (1820–1879), New Zealand politician and author, son of Edward Gibbon Wakefield
 Edward Wakefield (New Zealand politician) (1845–1924), New Zealand politician and journalist, grandson of Edward Wakefield (1774–1854)
 Sir Edward Wakefield, 1st Baronet (1903–1969), British civil servant and Conservative Party politician

Other
 Edward Wakefield (statistician) (1774–1854), English philanthropist and statistician
 Edward Thomas Wakefield (1821–1896), English ironmaster
 Ned Wakefield, a fictional character in the Sweet Valley High book series